MangoBaaz is a Pakistani internet media company based in Lahore. It was incubated at Punjab Information Technology Board's startup accelerator program, it began operations as a social news and entertainment company with a focus on digital media in 2014.

MangoBaaz was founded in late 2014 as an experiment on tracking viral content by Ali Gul and Ali Ahsan. After the favourable result, the cofounders left the Silicon Valley and registered it as a formal company in September 2015.

References 

Pakistani companies established in 2014
Pakistani entertainment websites
Internet properties established in 2014
Mass media companies of Pakistan
YouTube channels launched in 2015
Companies based in Lahore